Al-Arous is a sub-district located in Bani Matar District, Sana'a Governorate, Yemen. Al-Arous had a population of 4715 according to the 2004 census.

References 

Sub-districts in Bani Matar District